The karoo korhaan (Eupodotis vigorsii), also known as karoo bustard, is a species of bird in the bustard family, Otididae, from Southern Africa. The species is sometimes placed in the genus Heterotetrax. It is the sister-species to Rüppell's korhaan, and the two species are sometimes considered conspecific (the same species). There are two subspecies, the nominate race, from south-eastern South Africa, and E. v. namaqua (Roberts, 1932), from north-eastern South Africa and southern Namibia.

The karoo korhaan lives in a range of arid habitats associated with the karoo and other arid scrubland habitats found in eastern South Africa and Namibia. A small population can also be found in karro-like fynbos habitat in the SW Cape Province.

The karoo korhaan is a small bustard, . Males are larger and heavier, weighing  compared to the female's . The head, neck and breast of the nominate subspecies is grey-brown, with a black chin and throat edged in white. The belly is pinkish white, and the wings are brown. The female is similar to the male but has less black on the throat. The neck and breast of the subspecies E. v. namaqua is greyer compared to the nominate subspecies.

Karoo korhaans are omnivorous, but plant material is dominant in their diet. Flowers, fruit, leaves and corms all being taken. In particular, flowers from Asteraceae, Brassicaceae and Mesembryanthemaceae are all seasonally important.

References

External links
 Karoo korhaan - Species text in The Atlas of Southern African Birds

Eupodotis
Birds of Southern Africa
Birds described in 1831
Taxonomy articles created by Polbot
Taxobox binomials not recognized by IUCN